The Ambassador from Israel to Armenia was Israel's foremost diplomatic representative in Armenia.

Israel and Armenia established diplomatic relations in 1992.

List of Former Ambassadors

Ehud Gol (Non-Resident, Jerusalem) 2007–2008
Yuval Fuchs 2012–2016
Eliyahu Yerushalmi (Non-Resident, Jerusalem) 2017–2018
Eli Belozerkowski ? – Is ambassador in 2020

References 

Armenia
Israel